In quantum mechanics, the momentum operator is the operator associated with the linear momentum. The momentum operator is, in the position representation, an example of a differential operator. For the case of one particle in one spatial dimension, the definition is:

where  is Planck's reduced constant,  the imaginary unit,  is the spatial coordinate, and a partial derivative (denoted by ) is used instead of a total derivative since the wave function is also a function of time. The "hat" indicates an operator. The "application" of the operator on a differentiable wave function is as follows:

Note that the definition above is the canonical momentum, which is not gauge invariant and not a measurable physical quantity for charged particles in an electromagnetic field. In that case, the canonical momentum is not equal to the kinetic momentum.

At the time quantum mechanics was developed in the 1920s, the momentum operator was found by many theoretical physicists, including Niels Bohr, Arnold Sommerfeld, Erwin Schrödinger, and Eugene Wigner. Its existence and form is sometimes taken as one of the foundational postulates of quantum mechanics.

Origin from De Broglie plane waves
The momentum and energy operators can be constructed in the following way.

One dimension
Starting in one dimension, using the plane wave solution to Schrödinger's equation of a single free particle,

The first order partial derivative with respect to space is

This suggests the operator equivalence

so the momentum of the particle and the value that is measured when a particle is in a plane wave state is the eigenvalue of the above operator.

Since the partial derivative is a linear operator, the momentum operator is also linear, and because any wave function can be expressed as a superposition of other states, when this momentum operator acts on the entire superimposed wave, it yields the momentum eigenvalues for each plane wave component. These new components then superimpose to form the new state, in general not a multiple of the old wave function.

Three dimensions
The derivation in three dimensions is the same, except the gradient operator del is used instead of one partial derivative. In three dimensions, the plane wave solution to Schrödinger's equation is:

and the gradient is

This momentum operator is in position space because the partial derivatives were taken with respect to the spatial variables.

Definition (position space)

For a single particle with no electric charge and no spin, the momentum operator can be written in the position basis as:

In one spatial dimension, this becomes

This is the expression for the canonical momentum. For a charged particle  in an electromagnetic field, during a gauge transformation, the position space wave function undergoes a local U(1) group transformation, and  will change its value. Therefore, the canonical momentum is not gauge invariant, and hence not a measurable physical quantity.

The kinetic momentum, a gauge invariant physical quantity, can be expressed in terms of the canonical momentum, the scalar potential  and vector potential :

The expression above is called minimal coupling. For electrically neutral particles, the canonical momentum is equal to the kinetic momentum.

Properties

Hermiticity
The momentum operator is always a Hermitian operator (more technically, in math terminology a "self-adjoint operator") when it acts on physical (in particular, normalizable) quantum states.

(In certain artificial situations, such as the quantum states on the semi-infinite interval , there is no way to make the momentum operator Hermitian. This is closely related to the fact that a semi-infinite interval cannot have translational symmetry—more specifically, it does not have unitary translation operators. See below.)

Canonical commutation relation

One can easily show that by appropriately using the momentum basis and the position basis:

The Heisenberg uncertainty principle defines limits on how accurately the momentum and position of a single observable system can be known at once. In quantum mechanics, position and momentum are conjugate variables.

Fourier transform
The following discussion uses the bra–ket notation.  One may write 
 
so the tilde represents the Fourier transform, in converting from coordinate space to momentum space.  It then holds that 

that is, the momentum acting in coordinate space corresponds to spatial frequency,

An analogous result  applies for the position operator in the momentum basis,

leading to  further useful relations,

where  stands for Dirac's delta function.

Derivation from infinitesimal translations

The translation operator is denoted , where  represents the length of the translation. It satisfies the following identity:

that becomes

Assuming the function  to be analytic (i.e. differentiable in some domain of the complex plane), one may expand in a Taylor series about :

so for infinitesimal values of :

As it is known from classical mechanics, the momentum is the generator of translation, so the relation between translation and momentum operators is:

thus

4-momentum operator
Inserting the 3d momentum operator above and the energy operator into the 4-momentum (as a 1-form with  metric signature):

obtains the 4-momentum operator:

where is the 4-gradient, and the  becomes  preceding the 3-momentum operator. This operator occurs in relativistic quantum field theory, such as the Dirac equation and other relativistic wave equations, since energy and momentum combine into the 4-momentum vector above, momentum and energy operators correspond to space and time derivatives, and they need to be first order partial derivatives for Lorentz covariance.

The Dirac operator and Dirac slash of the 4-momentum is given by contracting with the gamma matrices:

instead.

See also
Mathematical descriptions of the electromagnetic field
Translation operator (quantum mechanics)
Relativistic wave equations
Pauli–Lubanski pseudovector

References

Quantum mechanics